The 1st National Congress of the Lao People's Party (LPP) was held in Vientiane on 22 March – 14 April 1955. The congress occurs once every five years. A total of 20 delegates attended the founding congress. In addition to the establishment of the Lao People's Party, its 1st Central Committee was elected at the congress with Kaysone Phomvihane as its General Secretary.

References

Congresses of the Lao People's Revolutionary Party
1955 in Laos
1955 conferences